Kilmartin Castle is a 16th-century Z-plan tower house castle at Kilmartin, Scotland. Built by the Rector of Kilmartin and later owned by Clan Campbell. It was restored and refurbished as a bed and breakfast in the 1990s.

References

External links
Royal Commission on the Ancient and Historical Monuments of Scotland listing - Kilmartin Castle, CANMORE

Castles in Argyll and Bute
Tower houses in Scotland